Mannheim Steamroller Christmas Live is Mannheim Steamroller's fourth Christmas album overall and was first released in 1997.  It is a recorded live performance which includes variations on the arranged tracks featured in previous Steamroller albums.

A companion DVD of the concert was also released. The light show consisted of a semi-transparent screen positioned in front of the musicians (as opposed to being in the back like most concerts) where various images would be projected to give a three dimensional look.

Track listing
 "Angels We Have Heard on High" – 4:03
 "Chip's Intro" – 2:03
 "Christmas Lullaby" – 4:10
 "Pat-a-Pan" – 5:09
 "Rudolph the Red-Nosed Reindeer" – 3:09
 "Los Peces en el Rio" – 3:52
 "Joy to the World" – 3:46
 "Gagliarda" – 3:17
 "In Dulci Jubilo" – 2:58
 "Wassail, Wassail" – 2:35
 "Carol of the Birds" – 2:12
 "I Saw Three Ships" – 1:33
 "God Rest Ye Merry, Gentlemen (Renaissance Version)" – 1:55
 "God Rest Ye Merry, Gentlemen (Rock Version)" – 4:29
 "Stille Nacht (Silent Night)" – 5:26
 "Going to Another Place" – 3:16

Personnel
Chip Davis: Drums, Recorders, Percussion, Toys
Jackson Berkey: Piano, Harpsichord, Keyboards
Arnie Roth: Concertmaster, Violin
Almeda Berkey: Harpsichord, Keyboards
Ron Cooley: Guitar, Fretted Instruments
Roxanne Layton: Recorders, Percussion
Chuck Penington: Conductor

Mannheim Steamroller Orchestra
Violins: Christopher Hake, Arnold Schatz, Karen Martin, Kimberly Salistean, Keith Plenert, Scott Shoemaker
Violas: Judy Divis, Sarah Richardson
Cellos: Gregory Clinton, Holly Stout
Oboe: Robert Jenkins
French Horn: Laurence Lowe
Harp: Janet Wesley Kelly
Trumpet: George Vosburgh, Eric Hansen

1997 Christmas albums
1997 live albums
Live Christmas albums
Live albums by American artists
1997 video albums
Live video albums
Mannheim Steamroller albums
Christmas albums by American artists
American Gramaphone live albums
Classical Christmas albums
New-age Christmas albums